Edward Larkin (1880–1915) was an Australian rugby union player and politician.

Edward Larkin may also refer to:

 Edward Larkin (American football) (1882–1948), American football coach
 Edward H. Larkin, Massachusetts politician, Mayor of Medford 1927–1931
 Edward P. Larkin (1915–1986), New York politician